Kaiso is a type of music popular in the Caribbean.

Kaiso may also refer to:
 Kaiso (gene) or ZBTB33, which encodes the protein transcriptional regulator Kaiso
 Kaiso, Uganda, a settlement in Hoima District

See also
 Kaiso Stories, a 2010 jazz album by Other Dimensions In Music
 Lucian Kaiso, a journal of The Folk Research Centre of Saint Lucia